Talitsa is a rural locality (a settlement) in Dobryansky District, Perm Krai, Russia. The population was 6 as of 2010. There are 19 streets.

References 

Rural localities in Dobryansky District